Delta Tau Delta Founders House is a historic home associated with Bethany College, at Bethany, Brooke County, West Virginia. It was built in the early 1850s, and is a two-story, five bay Greek Revival-style dwelling.  It is "L"-shaped and constructed of brick on a limestone foundation. The Delta Tau Delta fraternity was founded here in 1858–1859.

It was listed on the National Register of Historic Places in 1979.

References

Houses on the National Register of Historic Places in West Virginia
Greek Revival houses in West Virginia
Houses completed in 1858
Houses in Brooke County, West Virginia
National Register of Historic Places in Brooke County, West Virginia
Fraternity and sorority houses
Founders House